Etizolam (marketed under many brand names) is a thienodiazepine derivative which is a benzodiazepine analog. The etizolam molecule differs from a benzodiazepine in that the benzene ring has been replaced by a thiophene ring and triazole ring has been fused, making the drug a thienotriazolodiazepine.

Although a thienodiazepine, etizolam is clinically regarded as a benzodiazepine because of its mode of action via the benzodiazepine receptor and directly targeting GABAA receptors.

It possesses anxiolytic, amnesic, anticonvulsant, hypnotic, sedative and skeletal muscle relaxant properties. Etizolam is an anxiolytic found to have lower tolerance and dependence liability than benzodiazepines.

It was patented in 1972 and approved for medical use in 1983.

As of April 2021, the export of Etizolam has been banned in India.

Medical uses
 Short-term treatment of insomnia.
 Anxiety disorders such as OCD and general anxiety disorder, mostly as a short-term medication to be used purely on an at-need basis

Side effects
Long term use may result in blepharospasms, especially in women. Doses of 4 mg or more may cause anterograde amnesia.

In rare cases, erythema annulare centrifugum skin lesions have resulted.

Tolerance, dependence and withdrawal
Abrupt or rapid discontinuation from etizolam, as with benzodiazepines, may result in the appearance of the benzodiazepine withdrawal syndrome, including rebound insomnia. Neuroleptic malignant syndrome, a rare event in benzodiazepine withdrawal, has been documented in a case of abrupt withdrawal from etizolam. This is particularly relevant given etizolam's short half life relative to benzodiazepines such as diazepam resulting in a more rapid drug level decrease in blood plasma levels.

In a study that compared the effectiveness of etizolam, alprazolam, and bromazepam for the treatment of generalized anxiety disorder, all three drugs retained their effectiveness over 2 weeks, but etizolam became more effective from 2 weeks to 4 weeks.  Administering .5 mg etizolam twice daily did not induce cognitive deficits over 3 weeks when compared to placebo.

When multiple doses of etizolam, or lorazepam, were administered to rat neurons, lorazepam caused downregulation of alpha-1 benzodiazepine binding sites (tolerance/dependence), while etizolam caused an increase in alpha-2 benzodiazepine binding sites (reverse tolerance to anti-anxiety effects).  Tolerance to the anticonvulsant effects of lorazepam was observed, but no significant tolerance to the anticonvulsant effects of etizolam was observed. Etizolam therefore has a reduced liability to induce tolerance, and dependence, compared with classic benzodiazepines.

Etizolam may represent a possible anxiolytic of choice with reduced liability to produce tolerance and dependence after long-term treatment of anxiety and stress syndromes.

Pharmacology

Etizolam, a thienodiazepine derivative, is absorbed fairly rapidly, with peak plasma levels achieved between 30 minutes and 2 hours. It has a mean elimination half life of about 3.4 hours. Etizolam possesses potent hypnotic properties, and is comparable with other short-acting benzodiazepines.  Etizolam acts as a positive allosteric modulator of the GABAA receptor by agonizing the receptor's benzodiazepine site.

According to the Italian prescribing information sheet, etizolam belongs to a new class of diazepines, thienotriazolodiazepines. This new class is easily oxidized, rapidly metabolized, and has a lower risk of accumulation, even after prolonged treatment. Etizolam has an anxiolytic action about 6-8 times greater than that of diazepam. Etizolam produces, especially at higher dosages, a reduction in time taken to fall asleep, an increase in total sleep time, and a reduction in the number of awakenings. During tests, there were no substantial changes in deep sleep; however, it may reduce REM sleep. In EEG tests of healthy volunteers, etizolam showed some similar characteristics to tricyclic antidepressants.

Etizolam's main metabolites in humans are alpha-hydroxyetizolam and 8-hydroxyetizolam.  alpha-Hydroxyetizolam is pharmacologically active and has a half-life of approximately 8.2 hours.

Interactions 

Itraconazole and fluvoxamine slow down the rate of elimination of etizolam, leading to accumulation of etizolam, therefore increasing its pharmacological effects. Carbamazepine speeds up the metabolism of etizolam, resulting in reduced pharmacological effects.

Overdose

Cases of intentional suicide by overdose using etizolam in combination with GABA agonists have been reported. Although etizolam has a lower LD50 than certain benzodiazepines, the LD50 is still far beyond the prescribed or recommended dose. Flumazenil, a GABA antagonist agent used to reverse benzodiazepine overdoses, inhibits the effect of etizolam as well as classical benzodiazepines such as diazepam and chlordiazepoxide.

Etizolam overdose deaths are rising - for instance, the National Records of Scotland report on drug-related deaths, 'street' Etizolam was a factor in ("implicated in, or potentially contributed to") 752, or 59%, of drug-related deaths in Scotland in 2019. It is important to highlight that more than one drug contributed to the vast majority of the deaths (by way of comparison, opiates and opioids were a factor in 1092, or 86%, of drug-related deaths).

Society and culture

Brand names
Etilaam,  Sedekopan, Etizest, Etizex, Pasaden or Depas

Legal status

International drug control conventions
On December 13, 2019, the World Health Organization recommended Etizolam be placed in Schedule 4 of the 1971 Convention on Psychotropic Substances. This recommendation was followed by the placement of Etizolam into Schedule IV in March 2020.

Australia
Etizolam is not regulated and is not used medically or under medical prescription in Australia.

Denmark 
Etizolam is controlled in Denmark under the Danish Misuse of Drugs Act.

Germany
Etizolam was controlled in Germany in July 2013 but is not used medically.

Italy
Etizolam is licensed for the treatment of anxiety, insomnia and neurosis as a prescription-only medication.

India
In India, it is a prescription-only medication used for anxiety disorders, sometimes in combination with other drugs like propranolol.

United Kingdom

In the UK, etizolam has been classified as a Class C drug by the May 2017 amendment to The Misuse of Drugs Act 1971 along with several other designer benzodiazepine drugs.

United States
Etizolam is not authorized by the FDA for medical use in the U.S. However, it currently remains unscheduled at the federal level and is legal for research purposes as of March 2020.  As of March 2016, etizolam is a controlled substance in the following states: Alabama, Arkansas, Florida, Georgia (as Schedule IV, whereas all other states listed here prohibit it as a Schedule I substance), Louisiana, Mississippi, Texas, South Carolina, and Virginia. It is controlled in Indiana as of July 1, 2017. It is controlled in Ohio as of February 2018. As of December 2022, the DEA plans to put etizolam in temporary Schedule 1 effective January 23, 2023.

Misuse

Etizolam is a drug of potential misuse. Cases of etizolam dependence have been documented in the medical literature. However, conflicting reports from the World Health Organization, made public in 1991, dispute the misuse claims. Since 1991, cases of etizolam misuse and addiction have substantially increased, due to varying levels of accessibility and cultural popularity. Pills being sold as Xanax or other benzodiazepines that are illicitly manufactured may often contain etizolam rather than their listed ingredient

See also 

 Alprazolam
 Brotizolam
 Clotiazepam
 Deschloroetizolam
 Fluetizolam
 Metizolam
 Benzodiazepine dependence
 Benzodiazepine withdrawal syndrome
 Long-term effects of benzodiazepines

References

External links 
 Inchem.org - Etizolam

Chloroarenes
Designer drugs
GABAA receptor positive allosteric modulators
Hypnotics
Thienotriazolodiazepines